A glass bottle is a bottle made from glass. Glass bottles can vary in size considerably, but are most commonly found in sizes ranging between about 200 millilitres and 1.5 litres. Common uses for glass bottles include food condiments, soda, liquor, cosmetics, pickling and preservatives; they are occasionally also notably used for the informal distribution of notes. These types of bottles are utilitarian and serve a purpose in commercial industries.

History 

Glass bottles and glass jars are found in many households worldwide. The first glass bottles were produced in Mesopotamia around 1500 B.C., and in the Roman Empire around 1 AD. America's glass bottle and glass jar industry was born in the early 1600s, when settlers in Jamestown built the first glass-melting furnace. The invention of the automatic glass bottle-blowing machine in 1903 industrialized the process of making bottles.

Manufacture 
The earliest bottles or vessels were made by ancient man. Ingredients were melted to make glass and then clay forms were dipped into the molten liquid. When the glass cooled off, the clay was chipped out of the inside leaving just the hollow glass vessel. This glass was very thin as the fire was not as hot as modern-day furnaces. The blowpipe was invented around 1 B.C. This allowed molten glass to be gathered on the end of the blow pipe and blown into the other end to create a hollow vessel. Eventually, the use of a mold was introduced, followed by the invention of a semi-automatic machine, called the Press and Blow, by Yorkshire Iron founder, Howard Matravers Ashley, in 1886. In 1904 Michael Owens invented the automatic bottle machine, after working on the production of Electric lightbulbs, in Ohio, for Edison.

Once made, bottles may suffer from internal stresses as a result of unequal, or too rapid cooling. An annealing oven, or 'lehr', is used to cool glass containers slowly to prevent stress and make the bottle stronger. When a glass bottle filled with liquid is dropped or subjected to shock, the water hammer effect may cause hydrodynamic stress, breaking the bottle.

Characteristics

Markings 
Modern bottles, when moulded, will be given marks on the heel (bottom) of the bottle. These marks serve a variety of purposes, such as identifying the machine used in the production of the bottle (for quality control purposes), showing the manufacturer of the bottle, how much to fill the bottle to, the date the bottle was manufactured, as well as other information. Embossing on a bottle consists of raised lettering, numbers, and/or designs which were intended to inform the purchaser in some way of the contents or to establish ownership of the bottle.

Closures 
Glass bottles have a variety of closures to seal up the bottle and prevent the contents escape. Early bottles were sealed with wax, and later stoppered with a cork. More common today are screw caps and stoppers.

Disposal 
Glass recycling recovers a high rate of raw materials. Some countries have adopted container-deposit legislation to encourage recycling.

Examples 

Common shapes in modern commerce include:
 Boston round or Winchester bottles - cylinder with heavily rounded top and bottom; thick glass, typically clear, blue, or amber. Common in medical and scientific applications.
 Long-necked or Woozy bottles - tall cylinder with a prominent neck, many of which are used as beer bottles
 Wine bottle - very standard shape, mostly cylindrical but gradually narrowing into the neck
 Spice bottles
 Liquor bottles
 Olive oil bottles - tall and relatively thin with a prominent neck. Marasca bottles are rectangular cuboids on the bottom and rounded on top; Dorica bottles are cylinders.

See also 
Blow molding
 Boston round (bottle)
 Container glass
 Glass production
 Growler (jug)
 Mason jar
 List of bottle types, brands and companies
 Closure (container)
 Hutchinson Patent Stopper

References

Citations

Sources 
 Soroka, W, "Fundamentals of Packaging Technology", IoPP, 2002, 
 Yam, K. L., "Encyclopedia of Packaging Technology", John Wiley & Sons, 2009,

External links 
Antique Bottles collectors/traders
List of manufacturers' marks seen on glass bottles (primarily American)
 How Its Made - Glass Bottles 
 Glass Container HAACP, Glass Container Institute, 2009,